The 1998 Dunedin mayoral election re-elected Sukhi Turner as Mayor of Dunedin for a second term. The polling was conducted using the standard first-past-the-post electoral method.

Results
The following table shows the results for the election:

References 

Mayoral elections in Dunedin
Dunedin
Politics of Dunedin
1990s in Dunedin